The  is a Japanese funicular line in Beppu, Ōita. The line opened in 1929 as a gateway to Beppu Rakutenchi amusement park on Mount Tateishi. Although the line is legally considered as a public transit, not an attraction ride, riders have to pay the amusement park admission fee to take the funicular line. Local residents in Otobaru, the settlement on the mountain, are allowed to ride the line without the fee.

Basic data
Distance: 
System: Single track with two cars
Gauge: 
Stations: 2
Vertical interval: 
Maximum gradient: 558 ‰ or 55.8 %

Business changes
In July 2008, Okamoto announced that it would close the park as of the end of August 2008 if it could not find a successor. One of the reasons of the setback was that it failed to invite a Chinese circus team with two pandas because of the 2008 Sichuan earthquake. In August, it was reported that Okamoto fortunately found a buyer for the park: Kyūshū Kankō Hōmu, a real estate company in Ōita. However, talks between the companies broke down in October 2008 and the park closed on November 30, 2008.

The park and funicular resumed business on July 18, 2009.

See also
List of funicular railways
List of railway lines in Japan
List of railway companies in Japan

References

External links 
 Okamoto MFG official website 
 Beppu Rakutenchi official website 

Funicular railways in Japan
Rail transport in Ōita Prefecture
1067 mm gauge railways in Japan
Beppu, Ōita
1929 establishments in Japan